These are tables of congressional delegations from Oklahoma to the United States House of Representatives and the United States Senate.

The current dean of the Oklahoma delegation is Representative Frank Lucas (R), having served in Congress since 1994.

U.S. House of Representatives

Current members

1889–1907: one non-voting delegate

1907–1953
After the 1910 census, Oklahoma gained three seats. From 1913 to 1915, these extra seats were represented at-large. After 1915, all the seats were represented by districts. After the 1930 census, Oklahoma had its most seats, nine. The ninth seat represented the state at-large. After the 1940 census, the at-large seat was eliminated.

1953–present

United States Senate

Key

See also

 List of United States congressional districts
 Oklahoma's congressional districts
 Political party strength in Oklahoma

References 

 
 
Oklahoma
Politics of Oklahoma
Congressional delegations